Crystal Aikin is the eponymous debut album by Sunday Best first season winner, Crystal Aikin. The album was released on January 13, 2009 in the United States.

Recording
After winning the first season of Sunday Best on December 4, 2007, Aikin signed a recording contract with Zomba Gospel. She started her first album, which was produced by PAJAM, Dre & Vidal, Asaph Ward, and others.

Track listing
Information is based on Liner notes

Note
PAJAM is Paul D. Allen, J. Moss & Walter Kearney.

Personnel
Information is adapted from Allmusic
Musicians
Crystal Aikin - Lead Vocals
Paul "PDA" Allen - Various Instruments
Shawn Amos - Piano, Organ played by
Faith Anderson - Background Vocals
Minon Bolton - Background Vocals
Jimmy Bowland - Tenor Sax, Baritone Sax
Eddie Brown - Organ played by
Myron Butler - Background Vocals
Maurice Carter - Choir Member, Additional Vocals
Vinnie Ciesielski - Trumpet
Derek Clark - Drums, Keyboards
Aisha Cleaver - Background Vocals
Deonis "Pumah" Cook - Background Vocals
Idris Davis - Bass played by 
Vidal Davis - Various Instruments
Doriel Demps - Background Vocals
Errol Dixon - Background Vocals
DeBette Draper - Background Vocals
Ethan Farmer - Bass Guitar
Darrell Freeman - Bass played by
Andrew Gouché - Bass played by
Natalie Grant - Lead Vocals (10)
Barry Green - Trombone
Gerald Haddon - Piano
Andre Harris - Various Instruments
Andrea Harris - Background Vocals
Andrew Harris - Background Vocals
Bernie Herms - Fender Rhodes Piano
Chris Johnson - Drums
Jamar Jones - Strings played by
Adam Lester - Guitar
Keyondra Lockett - Background Vocals
Harold Martin - Additional Music performed by
Tim Mole - Guitar
J. Moss - Various Instruments, Background Vocals
Nashville String Machine - Strings played by
PAJAM's String Orchestra - Strings played by
LeAnne Palmore - Choir Member, Additional Vocals
Steve Patrick - Trumpet
Christine Richardson - Choir Member, Additional Vocals
Crystal Rucker - Background Vocals
Wendell "Pops" Sewell - Guitar
San Stancil - Choir Member, Additional Vocals
Rachel Stokes - Background Vocals
Asaph A. Ward - Piano, Keyboards
Miranda C. Ward - Background Vocals
Jason Webb - Piano, Hammond B3 Organ
Caltomeesh West - Background Vocals
Chelsea West - Background Vocals
Scott Williamson - Drums
Jerard Woods - Choir Member, Additional Vocals
Jovaun Woods - Choir Member, Additional Vocals
Daphanie Wright - Background Vocals

Technical
Paul "PDA" Allen - Audio Mixing
Monica Bacon - A&R, Production Coordination
Joe Baldridge - Recording Engineer
Lloyd Barry - Musical Arrangement, Horn Arrangement
Andrew Bazinet - Assistant Engineer
Brian Bradley - Recording Engineer, Assistant Engineer
Travis Brigman - Recording Engineer
Kasey Burdick - Recording Engineer
Jeff Cain - Music Editing
Anson Dawkins - Musical Arrangement
Bill Deaton - Audio Mixing
Matt Desando - Recording Engineer
Vincent Dilorenzo - Audio Mixing
Grant Greene - Recording Engineer, Assistant Engineer, Mixing Assistant
Gerald Haddon - Recording Engineer
Andrea Harris - Recording Engineer
Andrew Harris - Production Assistant, Assistant Engineer
Eric Hartman - Recording Engineer, Assistant Engineer
Bernie Herms - Musical Arrangement, String Arrangement, Vocal Recording Engineer
Kent Holmes - Assistant Engineer
John Jaszcz - Audio Mixing
Walter Kearney - Production Supervisor
Harold Lilly - Vocal Producer
Erik Madrid - Recording Engineer, Assistant Engineer
Jonathan Merritt - Recording Engineer, Assistant Engineer
J. Moss - Musical Arrangement, Orchestral Arrangement
Tre Nagella - Recording Engineer
JD Shuff - Assistant Engineer
Nick Sparks - Horns Recording Engineer
Brian Springer - Recording Engineer
Mike Tsafati - Recording Engineer
James Waddell - Strings Recording Engineer

Chart performance

The album peaked at #127 on the Billboard 200 and #3 on Billboard's Gospel Albums chart.

References 

2009 debut albums
Crystal Aikin albums
Albums produced by Dre & Vidal